Daniel David Sikes, Jr. (December 7, 1929 – December 20, 1987) was an American professional golfer who played on the PGA Tour and Champions Tour.  Sikes won nine tournaments as a pro, including six PGA Tour events. He was influential as the chairman of the tournament players committee in the late 1960s, prior to the formation of the PGA Tour.

Early years 
Born in Wildwood, Florida, Sikes was raised in Jacksonville and attended Andrew Jackson High School.

College career 
He enrolled the University of Florida in Gainesville, where he played for the Florida Gators' golf team in National Collegiate Athletic Association (NCAA) competition from 1951 to 1953.  He was recognized as an All-American in 1952—the University of Florida's first All-American golfer.  Sikes graduated from Florida with a bachelor's degree in business administration in 1953, and was later inducted into the University of Florida Athletic Hall of Fame as a "Gator Great."

Professional career 
Although he later earned a law degree from the university's College of Law and was known as the "golfing lawyer," he never actually practiced law. He was the chairman and spokesman of the controversial tournament players' committee prior to the formation of the "Tournament Players Division" in late 1968, which was later renamed the PGA Tour.

Sikes won the U.S. Amateur Public Links championship in 1958 while in law school.  He turned professional in 1960 and won six tournaments on the PGA Tour, half in his home state of Florida. Sikes' career year was 1967, when he won two events and was fifth on the money list. He was also the 54-hole leader at the PGA Championship and finished one shot out of the playoff, in a tie for third with Jack Nicklaus. Due to disputes with the PGA of America, the championship was nearly boycotted by the top tournament players. Sikes played on the Ryder Cup team in 1969 at Royal Birkdale.

Sikes later represented caddies on tour in 1970 and was instrumental in helping organize the Senior PGA Tour, later renamed the Champions Tour. He won three times on the senior tour, the first at the rain-shortened Hilton Head Seniors International in 1982, which Sikes and Miller Barber were leading when play was stopped.

Sikes died in Jacksonville at age 58 in late 1987. He was posthumously inducted into the Jacksonville Sports Hall of Fame in 1988.

Professional wins (9)

PGA Tour wins (6)

PGA Tour playoff record (0–2)

Senior PGA Tour wins (3)

*Note: The 1982 Hilton Head Seniors International was shortened to 36 holes due to weather.

Senior PGA Tour playoff record (0–2)

Results in major championships

Note: Sikes never played in The Open Championship.

CUT = missed the half-way cut
"T" indicates a tie for a place

Summary

Most consecutive cuts made – 21 (1962 U.S. Open – 1970 PGA)
Longest streak of top-10s – 1 (five times)

See also 

List of American Ryder Cup golfers
List of Florida Gators men's golfers on the PGA Tour
List of Levin College of Law graduates
List of University of Florida alumni
List of University of Florida Athletic Hall of Fame members

References

External links 

University of Florida Foundation   Dan Sikes Memorial Endowment 
Jacksonville.com   Athletes of the Century: Dan Sikes

American male golfers
Florida Gators men's golfers
PGA Tour golfers
PGA Tour Champions golfers
Ryder Cup competitors for the United States
Golfers from Jacksonville, Florida
Fredric G. Levin College of Law alumni
People from Wildwood, Florida
1929 births
1987 deaths